Grand River Township is a township in DeKalb County, in the U.S. state of Missouri.

Grand River Township was established in 1845, taking its name from the Grand River.

References

Townships in Missouri
Townships in DeKalb County, Missouri